Muckley Corner is a small village and area of Hammerwich in Lichfield District of Staffordshire, England.  The area is located on the A5 (Watling Street). It is on the border of the boroughs of Walsall and Lichfield.

Amenities
Muckley Corner is the only area of the parish of Hammerwich with a shop which is 24 hours. There was a post office in Hammerwich but it has long closed since.

Transport links
There is an hourly bus service from Lichfield to Walsall which runs via Aldridge and Rushall.  Muckley Corner is also close to the M6 Toll.  The South Staffordshire Line ran directly west of Muckley Corner. Hammerwich Station was only under a mile down what is now, Marebath Lane. The station was closer to Muckley Corner than Hammerwich itself. It closed in 1965 and the line closed in 1984 to Walsall but a stub from Brownhills to Lichfield via Hammerwich remained in use passing by Muckley Corner. This served an oil terminal until 2002 when the line was mothballed following closure of the oil terminal.

References

External links
https://getoutside.ordnancesurvey.co.uk/local/muckley-corner-lichfield
https://www.streetlist.co.uk/places/staffordshire/muckley-corner-(lichfield-district)
https://www.british-history.ac.uk/vch/staffs/vol14/pp283-294
https://www.british-history.ac.uk/vch/staffs/vol14/pp258-273
https://forebears.io/england/staffordshire/norton-canes/muckley-corner
https://www.francisfrith.com/uk/muckley-corner
https://brownhillsbob.com/tag/muckley-corner/
https://www.bfhg.org.uk/muckley-corner
http://www.stonnall-history-group.org.uk/articles/Stonnall_in_the_Old_Days.html

Villages in Staffordshire
Lichfield District